The 9th Bangladesh National Film Awards were presented by the Ministry of Information, Bangladesh, to felicitate the best of Bangladeshi cinema released in the year 1984. The Bangladesh National Film Awards is a film award ceremony in Bangladesh established in 1975 by the government of Bangladesh.  Every year, a national panel appointed by the government selects the winning entry, and the award ceremony is held in Dhaka. 1984 was the 9th ceremony of the National Film Awards.

List of winners
This year awards were given in 19 categories.

Merit awards

Technical awards

Special award
 Special Directorial Award - Morshedul Islam for Agami (Short Film)

See also
 Meril Prothom Alo Awards
 Ifad Film Club Award
 Babisas Award

References

External links

National Film Awards (Bangladesh) ceremonies
1984 film awards
1985 awards in Bangladesh
1985 in Dhaka
December 1985 events in Bangladesh